Wolica  is a village in the administrative district of Gmina Gać, within Przeworsk County, Subcarpathian Voivodeship, in south-eastern Poland.

The village has a population of 260.

History 
Wolica has no history of its own, its history was connected with Ostrów. 

It was only from 1926 that it stood to become independent. The name was created from a ravine in high embankments in which Tatars set up a magazine with weapons called zwolice in 1624. 

In 1880, the largest estate in the village belonged to Józef Stojałowski.

References

Wolica